Kipushi Mine (formerly Prince Léopold Mine) is an underground mine in the Democratic Republic of the Congo, near the town of Kipushi in Haut-Katanga Province.  

This was an active producing mine between 1925 and 1993, as of 2006 there was an estimated 16.9 million tons of ore in the measured and indicated categories, with a grade averaging of 16.7% zinc and 2.2% copper.

Since 2011, the Kipushi Mine is now majority owned by Ivanplats. A feasibility study was conducted in 2022, which found 11.78 million tonnes of Zinc at an ore grade of 35.34%. In September 2022, construction started to re-open the mine, with production planned to start in late 2024.

References

Copper mines in the Democratic Republic of the Congo
Lead mines in the Democratic Republic of the Congo
Zinc mines in the Democratic Republic of the Congo
Mining in Haut-Katanga Province
Underground mines in the Democratic Republic of the Congo
1925 establishments in the Belgian Congo
Non-renewable resource companies established in 1925